Richard David North (born 23 April 1990) is an English professional darts player who currently plays in World Darts Federation (WDF) and Professional Darts Corporation (PDC) events. From 2017 to 2020 he was a holder of the PDC Tour Card. He is a Malta Open Champion.

Career
A former bricklayer, North won a PDC Tour Card at Q-School in January 2017.

He had previously reached the last 64 of the 2011 UK Open, before losing 9–2 to Dave Chisnall.

His breakthrough year came after getting his Tour Card in 2017, where he reached the final of Players Championship 16, before losing in a last leg decider against Chisnall. He qualified for the 2017 World Grand Prix in Dublin, by his position in the pro tour ranking. He won his first round match against Mark Webster 2–0 in sets, holding his opponent to just one leg, to set up a second-round tilt with Simon Whitlock.

His form in 2017 saw him qualify for the 2018 PDC World Darts Championship as the highest-ranked player on the ProTour Order of Merit, but he was drawn against 5-time world champion Raymond van Barneveld, and the Dutchman dispatched North 3–0.

World Championship results

PDC
 2018: First round (lost to Raymond van Barneveld 0–3)
 2019: Second round (lost to Steve West 1–3)

Performance timeline

References

External links

1990 births
Living people
English darts players
Professional Darts Corporation former tour card holders
People from Hertford